Goethe Business School gGmbH (GBS) is a subsidiary of Goethe University Frankfurt.  Goethe Business School was founded 2004 and offers, in close cooperation with the Faculty of Economics and Business Administration, a wide range of education for executives and young professionals.

Competence Clusters 
GBS focuses on six topics, in which the competences of the faculty and the partner network expertise are combined: Finance Management, Bank Management, Risk Management & Regulation, Leadership & Personal Development, Strategic Management and Corporate Social Responsibility.

Part-Time Master in Finance (MFin) 
The part-time Master in Finance offered by GBS targets working professionals, who want to qualify for a career in the financial sector. The program offers the possibility to specialize in the domain of either finance or risk management and can be completed within three semesters plus Master Thesis.

Part-Time Master of Pharma Business Administration (MBA) 
The part-time Master of Pharma Business Administration offered by GBS targets professionals working in the pharmaceutical industry. It has been created by the combined expertise of Goethe Business School, the House of Pharma & Healthcare, the Faculty of Economics and Business Administration and the Faculty of Biochemistry, Chemistry and Pharmacy of Goethe University Frankfurt. The program awards an M.B.A degree.

Executive Education 
GBS provides a focused portfolio of open and individualized educational programs for executives and young professionals containing topics within the six competence clusters. In addition, the open programs contain several preparation courses for the Financial Risk Manager (FRM) exam in cooperation with the Global Association of Risk Professionals (GARP).

China Executive Education Center 
The China Executive Education Center at GBS has a special geographical focus, which educates executives from several Chinese financial institutions in different interdisciplinary management and financial topics thereby connecting business leaders from China and Europe.

Accreditation 
The Master in Finance is accredited by the Zentrale Evaluations- und Akkreditierungsagentur Hannover (ZEvA). The program is taught by Goethe University’s outstanding faculty as well as top professors from other leading institutions and prominent practitioners from major corporations. 
The Faculty of Economics and Business Administration is accredited by the Association to Advance Collegiate Schools of Business (AACSB).

Location 
Goethe Business School is located at the House of Finance at Campus Westend of the Goethe University in Frankfurt am Main.

External links 
 http://www.goethe-business-school.de/
 http://www.hof.uni-frankfurt.de/de/home.html
 http://www.wiwi.uni-frankfurt.de/startseite.html

References 

 http://www.goethe-business-school.de/
 http://www.hof.uni-frankfurt.de/de/home.html
 http://www.wiwi.uni-frankfurt.de/startseite.html
 https://www.garp.org/#!/home
 http://www.zeva.org/

Business schools in Germany
Goethe University Frankfurt